Tedhakattiटेढाकट्टी is a village and Village Development Committee in Bara District in the Narayani Zone of south-eastern Nepal. At the time of the 2011 Nepal census it had a population of 4623 people living in 476 individual households. According to the census 2011 it has population of more than 4683.

Its name was from Singh's family because first man of village was from Singh's family. The richest family of village is Singh's family. In this VDC there are two places Birta and Rupauliya. Nine wards in this VDC. After establishment of constitution on 10 March 2017A.D it falls in adarsh kotwal gaau palika. From this village some cities are nearby such as Kalaiya (24 km), Nijgadh (28 km), Kolavi (13 km), Simraungadh (12 km), Gaur (32 km), and Birganj (37 km). Now at present it is a ward of Adarsh Kotwal Gaau palika ward-5.

It is surrounded by river from all sides by the Aadua river. Nowadays many castes live here such as Bhumiaar, Giri, Shah, Yadav, Doom, Chamar, Pandit, etc. According to the census 2011 it has population of more than 4683.

References

External links
UN map of the municipalities of Bara District

Populated places in Bara District